William Synnton Anderson (1 July 1878 – 12 March 1915) was an Australian rules footballer who played with the St Kilda Football Club in the Victorian Football League (VFL).

References

External links 

1878 births
1915 deaths
Australian rules footballers from Victoria (Australia)
St Kilda Football Club players